Customatix (later "Cmax") was a Santa Cruz, California-based seller of made-to-order footwear launched in May 2000. The parent company, Solemates, Inc., was founded in 1999 by former Adidas executives Dave Ward, Irmi Kreuzer, Mikal Peveto and David Solk.

The Customatix.com website allowed the user to customize one of several shoe designs and purchase a pair of shoes. Each basic shoe design featured a large selection of customizable parameters, including choice of component materials and colors, plus text and graphics, allowing trillions of possible variations. 

The web application was created by a dot com engineering company called Lutris Technologies. The Chief Designer was Noel Barnes and Production Manager was Daryl L Tempesta. The Cmax project was published in the magazine "HOW". Over 1 million images were created. Some shoes had 3 billion trillion combinations .

Customized shoes were manufactured in China and shipped directly to the customer.

By mid-2004, the website had gone offline.

See also

 Mass customization
 Configuration system

References

External links
 2000 Forbes Article
 2001 Wired Article

Shoe companies of the United States
Companies based in Santa Cruz County, California
Santa Cruz, California
Clothing companies established in 2000
American companies disestablished in 2004
American companies established in 2000